Kata Kolok (literally "deaf talk"), also known as Benkala Sign Language and Balinese Sign Language, is a village sign language which is indigenous to two neighbouring villages in northern Bali, Indonesia. The main village, Bengkala,  has had high incidences of deafness for over seven generations. Notwithstanding the biological time depth of the recessive mutation that causes deafness, the first substantial cohort of deaf signers did not occur until five generations ago, and this event marks the emergence of Kata Kolok. The sign language has been acquired by at least five generations of deaf, native signers and features in all aspects of village life, including political, professional, educational, and religious settings.

Kata Kolok is linguistically unrelated to spoken Balinese or other sign languages. It lacks certain common contact sign phenomena that often arise when a sign language and an oral language are in close contact, such as fingerspelling and mouthing. It differs from other known sign languages in a number of respects: signers make extensive use of cardinal directions and real-world locations to organize the signing space, and they do not use a metaphorical "time line" for time reference. Additionally, Kata Kolok is the only known sign language which predominantly deploys an absolute frame of reference rather than an intrinsic or relative frame.

The Max Planck Institute for Psycholinguistics (MPI) and the International Institute for Sign Languages and Deaf Studies have archived over 100 hours of Kata Kolok video data. The metadata of this corpus are accessible online (see www.mpi.nl).

Deaf people in the village express themselves using special cultural forms such as deaf dance and martial arts and occupy special ritual and social roles, including digging graves and maintaining water pipes. Deaf and hearing villagers alike share a belief in a deaf god.

Bibliography
 Branson, Jan, Don Miller, I Gede Marsaja & I Wayan Negara (1996). Everyone Here Speaks Sign Language Too: A Deaf Village in Bali, Indonesia. In: Lucas, Ceil, ed. (1996): Multicultural Aspects of Sociolinguistics in Deaf Communities, 39–57. Washington, D.C.: Gallaudet University Press.
 Branson, J., Miller, D., & Marsaja, I. G. (1999). Sign Languages as Natural Part of the Linguistic Mosaic: The Impact of Deaf People on Discourse Forms in Northern Bali, Indonesia. In E. Winston (Ed.), Storytelling and Conversation (Vol. 5). Washington D.C.: Gallaudet University Press.
 De Vos, C. (2011). A signers' village in Bali, Indonesia. Minpaku Anthropology Newsletter, 33, 4–5. more
 De Vos, C. (2011). Kata Kolok color terms and the emergence of lexical signs in rural signing communities. The Senses & Society, 6(1), 68–76. doi:10.2752/174589311X12893982233795.
 De Vos, C. (2012). Sign-Spatiality in Kata Kolok: how a village sign language of Bali inscribes its signing space. PhD Dissertation. Nijmegen: Radboud University.
 Friedman, T. B., Hinnant, J. T., Fridell, R. A., Wilcox, E. R., Raphael, Y., & Camper, S. A. (2000). DFNB3 Families and Shaker-2 Mice: Mutations in an Unconventional Myosin, myo 15. Advances in Oto-Rhino-Laryngology, 56, 131–144.
 Friedman, T. B., Liang, Y., Weber, J. L., Hinnant, J. T., Barber, T. D., Winata, S., Arhya, I. N., et al. (1995). A gene for congenital, recessive deafness DFNB3 maps to the pericentrometric region of chromosome 17. Nature Genetics, 9, 86–91.
 Kortschak, Irfan (2010). "Everyone Speaks Deaf Talk" In: Kortschak, Irfan (2010): Invisible People: Poverty and Empowerment in Indonesia, The Lontar Foundation, Jakarta, Indonesia.
 Liang, Y., Wang, A., Probst, F. J., Arhya, I. N., Barber, T. D., Chen, K.-S., et al. (1998). Genetic Mapping Refines DFNB3 to 17p11.2, Suggests Multiple Alleles of DFNB3, and Supports Homology to the Mouse Model shaker-2. American Journal of Human Genetics, 62, 904–915.
 Marsaja, I. G. (2008). Desa Kolok - A deaf village and its sign language in Bali, Indonesia. Nijmegen: Ishara Press.
 Perniss, P., & Zeshan, U. (2008). Possessive and existential constructions in Kata Kolok. In P. Perniss & U. Zeshan (Eds.), Possessive and existential constructions in sign languages. Sign Language Typology Series No. 2. Nijmegen: Ishara Press.
 Winata, S., Arhya, I. N., Moeljopawiro, S., Hinnant, J. T., Liang, Y, Friedman, T B, & Asher, J. J. (1995). Congenital Non-Syndromal Autosomal Recessive Deafness in Bengkala, an Isolated Balinese Village. Journal of Medical Genetics, 32(5), 336–343.

References

Village sign languages
Sign languages of Indonesia
Balinese culture